Khadisha Debesette (born 6 January 1995) is a Trinidad and Tobago footballer who plays as a centre back for Club Sando and the Trinidad and Tobago women's national team.

International career
Debesette represented Trinidad and Tobago at the 2010 FIFA U-17 Women's World Cup. At senior level, she played the 2020 CONCACAF Women's Olympic Qualifying Championship qualification.

References

External links

1995 births
Living people
Women's association football central defenders
Trinidad and Tobago women's footballers
People from Siparia region
Trinidad and Tobago women's international footballers
College women's soccer players in the United States
West Texas A&M University alumni
Trinidad and Tobago expatriate women's footballers
Trinidad and Tobago expatriate sportspeople in the United States
Expatriate women's soccer players in the United States
Twin sportspeople
Trinidad and Tobago twins